This is a list of Norwegian television related events from 2013.

Events
10 May - Siri Vølstad Jensen wins the seventh series of Idol.
23 November - Singer and runner up of the seventh series of Idol Eirik Søfteland and his partner Nadya Khamitskaya win the ninth series of Skal vi danse?.
13 December - Knut Marius wins the second season of The Voice – Norges beste stemme.

Debuts

Television shows

2000s
Idol (2003-2007, 2011–present)
Skal vi danse? (2006–present)
Norske Talenter (2008–present)

2010s
The Voice – Norges beste stemme (2012–present)

Ending this year

Births

Deaths

See also
2013 in Norway